Wrestling the Angels is Kelly Minter's second studio album, third overall as she had previously released an independent album titled Wheels Of Change in 1997. According to Minter, the album's title, Wrestling the Angels, was inspired by her reading of Jacob's struggle in Genesis.

Critical reception

Ashleigh Kittle of AllMusic begins her review by saying, "Singer/songwriter Kelly Minter released her sophomore project Wrestling the Angels in the fall of 2003. Produced by Margaret Becker and Paul Buono, the acoustic pop album is similar in style to the early music of Susan Ashton as well as (Margaret) Becker's later projects."

Tony Cummings of Cross Rhythms gives this album 7 out of a possible 10 and concludes his revies with, "Maybe not the most innovative release to emerge from the US CCM but definitely a good showcase for a singer/songwriter with a heart for mission."

Crosswalks interview with Minter mention's this about the album, "Wrestling the Angels, the organic-pop recording produced by (Margaret) Becker and Paul Buono, paves the way for Minter to pick up where she left off — this time more weathered and content to follow the simple advice Kim Hill offered her close to a decade ago: "Bloom where you’re planted."

Track listing

Musicians"This is My Offering"Kelly Minter: Vocals, Acoustic, High Strung & Electric Guitars, Background Vocals
Ken Lewis: Drums & Percussion
Chris Donohue: Bass & Electric Guitars
Keith Getty: String Arrangements
Prague Symphony Orchestra: Strings
Jonathan Noel: Keyboards
Steven Leiweke: Electric Guitars & Programming
Peter Penrose: Background Vocals
Cheri Bebout: Background Vocals
Margaret Becker: Background Vocals
Kathy Shooster: Background Vocals"Open Up the Sky"Kelly Minter: Vocals, Acoustic, Background Vocals
Dan Needham: Drums & Percussion
Mark Hill: Bass
George Cocchini: Electric Guitar
Paul Buono: Guitars, Electric Sitar, Keyboards, Programming
Love Sponge Strings: David Davidson, Monisa Angell, David Angell & Anthony LaMarchina
Paul Buono & David Davidson: String Arrangement"Shade"Kelly Minter: Vocals, Acoustic, High Strung & Electric Guitars, Background Vocals
Ken Lewis: Drums & Percussion
Chris Donohue: Bass & Electric Guitars, Whistle
Keith Getty: String Arrangements
The Prague Symphony Orchestra: Strings
Jonathan Noel: Keyboards
Steven Leiweke: Electric Guitars
Peter Penrose: Background Vocals
Cheri Bebout: Background Vocals
Margaret Becker: Background Vocals
Kathy Shooster: Background Vocals"Wrestling the Angels"Kelly Minter: Vocals, Acoustic Guitar, Background Vocals
Dan Needham: Drums & Percussion
Matt Pierson: Bass
George Cocchini: Electric Guitar
Paul Buono: Dobro, Keyboards, Programming
Blair Masters: B3
Steve Short: Bell Tree
Strings: David Davidson, Monisa Angell, David Angell & Anthony LaMarchina
Paul Buono & David Davidson: String Arrangement"Love Has Come"Kelly Minter: Vocals, Acoustic, Background Vocals
Dan Needham: Drums & Percussion
Mark Hill: Bass
George Cocchini: Electric Guitar
Paul Buono: Guitars, Keyboards, Programming"Say the Word"Kelly Minter: Vocals, Acoustic Guitars, Background Vocals
Ken Lewis: Drums & Percussion
Chris Donohue: Bass & Electric Guitars, Accordion, Whistle
Keith Getty: String Arrangements
The Prague Symphony Orchestra: Strings
Gary Burnette: Classical Guitar
Paul Nelson: Cello
Jonathan Noel: Keyboards
Steven Leiweke: Electric Guitars
Cheri Bebout: Background Vocals
Margaret Becker: Background Vocals
Kathy Shooster: Background Vocals"Miss You Here"Kelly Minter: Vocals, Acoustic Guitar, Background Vocals
Dan Needham: Drums & Percussion
Matt Pierson: Upright Bass
George Cocchini: Electric Guitar
Paul Buono: Banjo, Mandolin, Keyboards, B3
Blair Masters: Rhodes"Walk Me Trough"Kelly Minter: Vocals, Acoustic Guitar, Background Vocals
Dan Needham: Drums & Percussion
Matt Pierson: Bass
George Cocchini: Electric Guitar
Sarah Jahn: Background Vocals
Paul Buono: Guitars, Keyboards, Programming, Background Vocals
Steven Leiweke: Melotron"Yet Will I Praise"Kelly Minter: Vocals, Acoustic Guitar, Background Vocals
Dan Needham: Drums & Percussion
Matt Pierson: Bass
George Cocchini: Electric Guitar
Paul Buono: Guitars, B3, Keyboards, Programming
Love Sponge Strings: David Davidson, Monisa Angell, David Angell & Anthony LaMarchina
Paul Buono & David Davidson: String Arrangement
Peter Penrose: Background Vocals
Cheri Bebout: Background Vocals
Margaret Becker: Background Vocals"Captives Dance"Kelly Minter: Vocals, Acoustic Guitar, Background Vocals
Dan Needham: Drums & Percussion
Matt Pierson: Bass
George Cocchini: Electric Guitar
Paul Buono: Guitars, Keyboards, Piano, Programming
Blair Masters: Piano"You're Listening"'
Kelly Minter: Vocals
Paul Buono: Nylon Guitar
John Catchings: Cello

Production
Producer: Margaret Becker (tracks 1, 3, 6)
Producer: Paul Buono (tracks 2, 4-5, 7-11)
Engineer: Rob Burrell
Assistant Engineer: Mike Modesto
Additional Engineering: Steve Short and Stephen Leiweke
Additional Engineering: Tone Chaperon and Electric Guitar Production by George Cocchini
Mixer: Jim Dineen at The Hideout, Franklin, Tennessee
Mastered by Hank Williams at Mastermix, Nashville, Tennessee
Management: Pamela Muse at Muse and Associates, Inc.

Track information and credits verified from the album's liner notes.

References

External links
Kelly Minter Official Site
Dark Horse Studios Official Site
The Castle Studios Official Site

2003 albums
Kelly Minter albums